Beydili is a village in the Araban District, Gaziantep Province, Turkey. The village is inhabited by Turkmens.

References

Villages in Araban District